Obninsk Institute for Nuclear Power Engineering (traditionally abbreviated ) is an institution of higher education located in Obninsk. It began as a branch of the Moscow Engineering and Physics Institute in 1953 to provide specialists in the field of nuclear physics, reactor physics and reactor engineering for the Soviet Union's growing nuclear industry. The education was provided in close cooperation with nuclear-related research institutions in Obninsk.

In 1985 the status was changed for Obninsk Institute for Nuclear Power Engineering to be the leading educational institution to train specialists for rapidly developing nuclear power in the former Soviet Bloc countries. In 2002 it acquired the status of the state technical university. In 2002-2009 it functioned as the Obninsk State Technical University for Nuclear Power Engineering..

In 2009 the Obninsk State Technical University for Nuclear Power Engineering  was incorporated into the MEPhI National Research Nuclear University.

Structure 

Since 2017, recruitment for the main educational programs of higher education at the IATE NRNU MEPhI has been carried out in new structural divisions.

 Division of the Institute of Nuclear Physics and Technology (ОЯФиТ)
 Division of the Institute of Intelligent Cybernetic Systems (ОИКС)
 Division of Engineering Physics Institute of Biomedicine (ИФИБ)
 Division of the Institute of Laser and Plasma Technologies (ЛаПлаз)
 Department of Social and Economic Sciences (ОСЭН)
 Institute of General Professional Training
 Preparatory Faculty
 Technical College

Other:

Center for Continuing Professional Education

Directions of training and specialties 

 01.03.02 Applied Mathematics and Informatics. Qualification: Bachelor.
 03.03.02 Physics. Qualification: Bachelor.
 09.03.01 Informatics and computer technology. Qualification: Bachelor.
 09.03.02 Information systems and technologies. Qualification: Bachelor.
 12.03.01 Instrument making. Qualification: Bachelor.
 03.14.01 Nuclear power engineering and thermal physics. Qualification: Bachelor.
 03.14.02 Nuclear physics and technology. Qualification: Bachelor.
 03.16.01 Technical physics. Qualification: Bachelor.
 22.03.01 Materials science and technology of materials. Qualification: Bachelor.
 05.14.01 Nuclear reactors and materials. Qualification: engineer-physicist.
 05.14.02 Nuclear power plants: design, operation and engineering. Qualification: engineer-physicist.
 05.14.04 Electronics and automation of physical installations. Qualification: engineer-physicist.
 04.03.01 Chemistry. Qualification: Bachelor.
 04.03.02 Chemistry, physics and mechanics of materials. Qualification: Bachelor.
 06.03.01 Biology. Qualification: Bachelor.
 31.05.01 Medicine. Qualification: medical doctor.
 38.03.01 Economics. Qualification: Bachelor.
 38.03.05 Business Informatics. Qualification: Bachelor.
 01.04.02 Applied Mathematics Informatics. Qualification: Master.
 04.04.02 Chemistry, physics and mechanics of materials. Qualification: Master.
 06.04.01 Biology. Qualification: Master.
 09.04.01 Informatics and computer technology. Qualification: Master.
 09.04.02 Information systems and technologies. Qualification: Master.
 12.04.01 Instrument making. Qualification: Master.
 04.14.01 Nuclear power engineering and thermal physics. Qualification: Master.
 04.14.01 Nuclear power engineering and thermal physics. Qualification: Master.
 04.14.02 Nuclear physics and technology. Qualification: Master.
 04.22.01 Materials science and technology of materials. Qualification: Master.
 38.04.02 Management. Qualification: Master.
 38.04.04 State and municipal administration. Qualification: Master.

Notable alumni and students 

 Svetlana Roudenko
 Leonid Solodkov
 Polina Volkova

References

External links
 Official site 
 Official site

Universities in Kaluga Oblast
Universities and institutes established in the Soviet Union
Nuclear research institutes in Russia
Nuclear technology in the Soviet Union
1953 establishments in Russia
 
Moscow Engineering Physics Institute
Obninsk
Educational institutions established in 1953
Universities established in the 1950s
Public universities and colleges in Russia
Research institutes in the Soviet Union